= Hospital San Hipólito, Mexico City =

Hospital in Mexico City, Mexico

San Hipólito Hospital is a general medical facility in Mexico City that began as the first psychiatric facility in the Americas. It was founded by Brother Bernardino Álvarez in 1569. It was supported by the first religious order in Mexico called San Hipolito Order of Charity. The money used to maintain the hospital came from alms that Christians collected on the streets. The people who worked on San Hipólito Hospital were prisoners, captured pirates and slaves, which included the indigenous. The hospital's building has changed its purpose several times. It started as a psychiatric hospital that then changed into a military base, which three years later was used again as a hospital. In 1905, the building was partially destroyed. When it was rebuilt, it became a shelter for poor people. At the end of 1970, the facilities were once again a hospital but this time as a general medical center.

== History ==
In the 17th century, New Spain’s economy began to grow rapidly. New Spain began to produce its own food and textiles, leading to greater self-sufficiency. Christianity became important for the hospitals because they were the most concerned about helping sick people. Because of Renaissance ideas and the recovery of old texts, the information about different mental illnesses began to expand. The monks and nuns that helped the ill began to search for different ways to raise money for them. The poor condition of many hospitals was not the Church’s fault. In New Spain during the XVI and 17th centuries, hospitals functioned with little money, because at that time the Spanish Crown did not support them. To have access to medicine, clean clothes and food, they had to collect alms on the richer areas from the faithful, who gave money to feel satisfaction and have a place in heaven. Hospitals began at the end of the 16th century with the growing economy, money for hospitals and charity became more plentiful. In the 17th century, the hospitals began to grow.

The “San Hipolito Order of Charity” (Orden de la Caridad de San Hipólito) was the first religious order in Mexico. Brother Bernardino Alvarez (1514–1584) promoted the formation of a congregation to take care of the ill, founding the hospital in 1569. This congregation was given all the privileges of which the Brothers Hospitallers of St. John of God enjoyed. The Brothers remained as a congregation until 1700, when the petition of Hipolitos and Pope Innocence XII gave them the possibility of making chastity votes, poorness, obedience and hospitality under the rule of San Agustín . The San Hipólito Brothers’ order was important for New Spain because seven hospitals were under their charge, six of which were founded by money obtained from alms. One of those was San Hipólito hospital, also founded by Bernardino Ávarez. He was a priest born on Rosales León, Spain. He studied humanities and Latin on a preceptorship located on Vegarienza, León. He did his training prior making his vows before being a member of the religious institute on El Escorial Monastery, where he finalized his novitiate in September 22, 1531. He worked in Rome, in the Real Monastery, in the Ucles Monastery and in Santiago Monastery. He became a priest in 1538. He went back to Spain, where he worked as a teacher in El Escorial Monastery. Bernardino Álvarez was imprisoned on August 6, 1547. When he was released, he went to Mexico after the fall of Tenochtitlan. When he arrived, he started the religious order of the Hipólitos. He founded San Hipolito Hospital and “Santa Cruz” hospital in Oaxtepec, Morelos, Mexico. This hospital was also dedicated for patients with mental diseases. During the next years, he opened other hospitals, one in Puebla that was named “San Roque” which was for female psychiatric patients, another one in Jalapa, Veracruz called “La Concepción”, and one in Acapulco, Guerrero. Álvarez decided the foundation of five hospitals in Mexico was not enough so he traveled to Mesoamerica and founded more hospitals than he expected all the way from La Habana, Cuba to Mexico. The information about his death is nonexistent but it is known that today there is a tribute to the priest on the Hospital de Jesús.

San Hipólito Hospital was built in Mexico City. It is considered as the first establishment on America founded for people with mental illnesses. The hospital was founded with the purpose of taking care of the people who suffered, such as poor and mentally ill that were on the streets. San Hipolito began with 85 beds. The people who worked on the hospital were mostly Christians, but they were not the only ones. The authorities that helped the hospitals financially also helped them by sending slaves and indigenous slaves. The indigenous were the ones that built hospitals, public buildings and houses of important men in the colony, so they rarely helped inside the hospital. They were afraid of working for the ill because of the diseases they carried. San Hipolito Hospital was the most feared hospital of all because it was mainly for the demented people. Because there were not many workers there, sometimes the mentally ill had to work by sweeping, carrying water, cleaning etc. Some of the workers at the hospital were captured pirates.

In 1853, the San Hipólito Hospital became a military base. Finally in 1856 it became a medical center specializing on psychiatric patients again. The hospital continued like that for a while until 1905, when the building was partially destroyed because the government made a new street called Heroes. All the patients where asked to leave and they were transferred to a hospital in Texcoco. There was not enough space in that hospital so some of the patients where transferred to prison. In 1910 as part of the celebration of Mexican Independence, the hospital facilities became known as “La Castañeda”. Between 1960 and 1970, the facilities were used to help poor people without a house by giving them shelter for the night.

== Modern institution ==
Today, the hospital is a general services institution. The building is located on the northeast of a large garden called “Alameda Central” at Guanajuato Avenue in Cuauhtémoc neighborhood, between two important avenues: Paseo de la Reforma and Hidalgo avenue in México City.

The hospital's installations include two operating rooms, one recuperation area, a birth room, a phototherapy lamp, an incubator cradle, a pressure fan for neonates, X-ray services, laboratory, equipment for ultrasound and twenty-two rooms with their own bathroom, oxygen and phone. The hospital is available 24 hours a day. The specialties are: traumatology, plastic surgery, orthopedics, general medicine, gastroenterology, internal medicine, dermatology, X-rays, laboratory, ultrasound, urology and angiology.
