= Bernardino Álvarez =

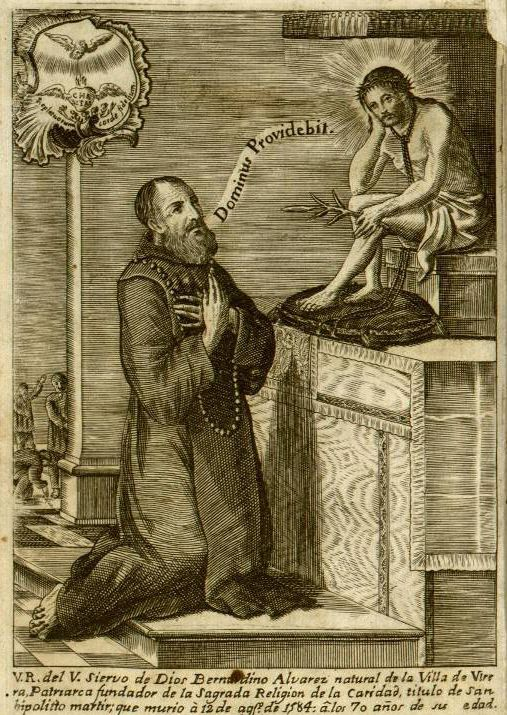
- frontispiece of a 1762 biography
- Born: 1514
- Died: August 12, 1584 (aged 69–70)

Bernardino Álvarez (1514 – August 12, 1584) was a Catholic philanthropist and founder of the first psychiatric hospital in the Americas. He founded the Congregation of the Brothers of Charity and Saint Hipolito Martyr in New Spain.

Álvarez was born on 1514 in Seville. He arrived in New Spain as a young soldier, but was dismissed for misconduct. In and out of trouble with the law, and facing prison, he escaped to Peru, where he amassed a large fortune in Cuzco. Hearing of his father's death, he returned to Mexico City and pledged to lead a Christian life. He volunteered for La Purisima Concepción Hospital, founded by Hernán Cortés, and was eventually inspired to found his own hospitals. He devoted his wealth to establishing the Hospital of San Hipolito in 1567, next to the hermitage dedicated to the Spanish martyrs of the conquest. The hospital was the first in the Americas devoted to the mentally ill. He soon founded others in Oaxtepec, Veracruz, and other cities of New Spain. He established his own congregation of hospillaters, the Brothers of Charity and Saint Hipolito Martyr. His philanthropy had an important impact on psychiatric medicine and public health in New Spain. Juan Diaz de Arce published his vita in 1651 (Mexico City), a book reprinted in 1762. Although Álvarez was never beatified, his hagiography serves as an important source for historians of science and medicine.

Bernardino Álvarez died on 12 August 1584 in Mexico.
